Eucalyptus carnea, known as the thick-leaved mahogany or broad-leaved white mahogany, is a species of tree that is endemic to coastal areas of eastern Australia. It has rough, stringy bark from the trunk to the thinnest branches, lance-shaped or curved adult leaves, flower buds in groups of between seven and eleven, white flowers and cup-shaped to hemispherical fruit.

Description
It has rough grey or brownish, stringy or fibrous bark from the trunk to the thinnest branches. The leaves are bluish green on one side and a lighter green on the other. Flowering mainly occurs from September to November and the flowers are white.

Taxonomy and naming
Eucalyptus carnea was first formally described by the botanist Richard Thomas Baker in 1906 from specimens collected near the Richmond River by William Baeuerlen, (previously known as Wilhelm Bäuerlen). The description was published in Proceedings of the Linnean Society of New South Wales. The specific epithet (carnea) is a Latin word meaning "of flesh", possibly referring to the colour of the heartwood.

Eucalyptus carnea is part of the white mahogany group as recognised by Ken Hill. Others in the group include E. acmenoides, E. mediocris, E. apothalassica, E. helidonica, E. latisinensis, E. psammitica and E. umbra.

Distribution and habitat
Thick-leaved mahogany grows in forest in shallow soil between Gympie in Queensland and the Hunter River in New South Wales.

References

carnea
Myrtales of Australia
Flora of New South Wales
Flora of Queensland
Trees of Australia
Plants described in 1906
Taxa named by Richard Thomas Baker